Jeyran is a 2022 Iranian historical romance television series directed by Hassan Fathi, written by Ehsan Javanmard and Fathi and produced by Esmaeil Afifeh. The series was originally released on Filimo. Starring Parinaz Izadyar and Bahram Radan, Jeyran tells the love story of Naser al-Din Shah Qajar.

Storyline 
The series is about the life of Jeyran, Naser al-Din Shah's favorite and first mistress. The story takes place in Iran, 19th century.

Cast 

 Parinaz Izadyar as Jeyran
 Bahram Radan as Naser al-Din Shah
 Amirhossein Fathi as Siavash Panjsangi
 Mahdi Pakdel as Salman
 Setareh Pesyani as Noghreh
 Ghazal Shakeri as Malekzadeh
 Samira Hassanpour as Glin Khanum
 Mehdi Koushki as Elias
 Morteza Esmail Kashi as Khajeh Roshan
 Fatemeh Masoudifar as Sara the Georgian (Sara-ye Gorji)
 Elham Nami as Shkoh al-Sultaneh
 Nahal Dashti as Setare Khanom
 Kataneh Afshar Nejad as Khadijeh Chahrighi
 Behnaz Nazi as Naneh Ashob
 Amir Jafari as Mirza Aqa Khan Nuri
 Roya Teymourian as Kefayat Khatun
 Hooman Barghnavard as Shazde Basir
 Rana Azadivar as Taj al-Dawlah
 Merila Zarei as Mahd-e Olia
 Gholamreza Nikkhah as Aziz Agha
 Mohammad Shiri as Khajehbashi
 Siavash Cheraghipour as Kuchul Khan
 Hamidreza Naimi as Mohammad Ali Khan Tajrishi
 Sina Razani as Asadollah
 Amir Karbalayizadeh as Farzi Fozul
 Behnam Sharafi as Mirza Kazem Nezam ol-Molk
 Reza Jahani as Ali Khan Hajeb ol-Dowleh
 Nasrin Nakisa as Jeyran's mother
 Pasha Jamali as Shemshad
 Ashkan Hoorsan as Bahador
 Setayesh Dehghan as Golnesa
 Hassan Moazzeni as Khajeh Golshan
 Mohammad-Hadi Ghomshi Bozorg as astrologer
 Behzad Davari as Aziz Khan Mokri
 Vahid Razzaghi Moghadam as Rahmat
 Parviz Bozorgi as Koohsar village head
 Navid Goodarzi as Soleiman's viceroy
 Farshid Samadipour as Mahmoud Khan
 Roham Tadrisi as Esfandyar
 Ali Ashmand as Khajeh Ghanbar
 Mohammad Ali Mojdehi as Khajeh Eghbal
 Mohsen Naghibian as tavern keeper
 Kambiz Amini as Khajeh Mobarak
 Rastin Azizpour as Abbas Mirza Molkara
 Ilia Nasrollahi as Samuel
 Abbas Tofighi as Khajeh Dolat
 Atefeh Gholampour as Parvin
 Hooshang Ghanavatizadeh as chairman of foreign affairs
 Shahnoosh Shahbazzadeh as village head's wife
 Arash Kalhor as Malekzadeh's khajeh

Production

Distribution

Reception

Soundtracks

Jeyran OST

See also 

 Qajar dynasty
 Qajar Iran

References

External links
 
 Jeyran at HA international

2020s Iranian television series
Iranian television series
Historical television series